Hammerfestingen is a local Norwegian newspaper. 

The paper is published weekly in Hammerfest, and it first appeared on December 22, 2011. Caroline Greiner started the paper and was the editor until 2017 when 
Bjørn Egil Jakobsen was appointed editor. The paper is a member of the National Association of Local Newspapers.

In 2022, Amedia became the major shareholder.

Circulation
According to the Norwegian Audit Bureau of Circulations and National Association of Local Newspapers, Hammerfestingen has had the following annual circulation:
2012: 1,132 
2013: 1,194 
2014: 1,330
2015: 1,209
2016: 1,235

References

External links
Hammerfestingen home page

Weekly newspapers published in Norway
Norwegian-language newspapers
Mass media in Finnmark
Hammerfest
Publications established in 2011
2011 establishments in Norway